D'Antona, D'antona, d'Antona or Dantona may refer to the following:

People
D'Antona (name)

Other
Dantona, genus of moths
Buovo d'Antona, Italian translation of Bevis of Hampton
Buovo d'Antona (Traetta), Italian opera about the Bevis of Hampton

See also

Antona (disambiguation)